The list of ship decommissionings in 1886 includes a chronological list of all ships decommissioned in 1886.


See also 

1886
 Ship decommissionings